Hymenopenaeus methalli is a species of prawn in the family Solenocridae. The species range is in the Western Central Pacific, living at depths from 570 to 855 meters below the ocean surface.

References 

Crustaceans described in 2004

Solenoceridae